Grootvlei Power Station in Grootvlei, Mpumalanga, South Africa.

History
The first of Grootvlei's six units was commissioned in 1969. In 1989 three units were mothballed and in 1990 the other three followed. Due to the power crisis being experienced in South Africa, Eskom decided to return the station to service. By 2008 three of Grootvlei's units were back online, providing 585MW to the national grid.

Grootvlei's units 5 and 6 were the first test facilities for dry cooling in South Africa. Unit 6 has an indirect dry cooling system.

Power generation
The design efficiency at rated Turbine Maximum Continuous Rating is 32.90%

Crime
Mid-December 2022, at the request of the Minister of Public Enterprises, Pravin Gordhan, and President Cyril Ramaphosa, Minister of Defence Thandi Modise deployed a small contingent of SANDF troops at the station (besides at Camden, Majuba and Tutuka) to curb a growing threat of sabotage, theft, vandalism and corruption.

See also 

 Eskom
 Fossil-fuel power plant
 List of power stations in South Africa

References

External links 
 Grootvlei Power Station  on the Eskom-Website

Energy infrastructure completed in 1969
Coal-fired power stations in South Africa
Buildings and structures in Mpumalanga
Economy of Mpumalanga
20th-century architecture in South Africa